Petrus Andreas Gambari or Pier Andrea Gambari (1480 - 1528) was a Roman Catholic prelate who served as Bishop of Faenza (1528).

Biography
On 7 Aug 1528, Petrus Andreas Gambari was appointed during the papacy of Pope Clement VII as Bishop of Faenza.
He served as Bishop of Faenza only for a month until his death in Sep 1528.

Works

References

External links and additional sources
 (for Chronology of Bishops) 
 (for Chronology of Bishops)  

16th-century Italian Roman Catholic bishops
Bishops appointed by Pope Julius II
1528 deaths
1480 births